Lazur (also Romanized as Lazūr, Lazir, Lazoor, and Lezor; also known as Lazūz) is a village in Qazqanchay Rural District of Arjomand District of Firuzkuh County, Tehran province, Iran. At the 2006 National Census, its population was 2,160 in 521 households. The following census in 2011 counted 965 people in 314 households. The latest census in 2016 showed a population of 1,288 people in 460 households; it was the largest village in its rural district.

References 

Firuzkuh County

Populated places in Tehran Province

Populated places in Firuzkuh County